The 1930 season of the Mitropa Cup football club tournament was won by Rapid Vienna in a two-legged final against Sparta Prague. This was the fourth edition of the tournament.

The holders, Újpesti FC, lost in the quarter final against the italian team AS Ambrosiana.

The final was played on 2 and 12 November 1930 in Prague and Vienna. The finalists Sparta Prague and Rapid Wien had played against each other in the 1927 Mitropa Cup final, with Sparta winning on aggregate 7–3. Rapid were playing in their third Mitropa Cup final in four years. Sparta lost at home 0–2, the first away victory in a Mitropa Cup final. Sparta's 3–2 away win, the second away victory in a Mitropa Cup final, meant that Rapid became the first Austrian club to win this tournament. Giuseppe Meazza from AS Ambrosia was top scorer in the tournament with seven goals. Josef Košťálek scored all three of Sparta Prague's goals in the final.

The semi-finals and both legs of the final were refereed by Sophus Hansen of Denmark.

Quarterfinals

|}
a Match decided by play off.

Play-offs

|}

Semifinals

|}

Finals

|}

1st leg

2nd leg

Top goalscorers

References

External links 
 Mitropa Cup results at Rec.Sport.Soccer Statistics Foundation

1930–31
1930–31 in European football
1930–31 in Austrian football
1930–31 in Italian football
1930–31 in Czechoslovak football
1930–31 in Hungarian football